Attanayake Mudiyanselage Kudabanda Tissa Attanayake is a Sri Lankan politician, who is a National List member of the Parliament of Sri Lanka. He was first elected to parliament in 1989. Former general secretary of United National Party, Attanayake was appointed a Minister under the UNP government in 2001 and later by Rajapaksa in 2014. He only served 20 days under Rajapaksa. He resides in Colombo.

Attanayake a loyal member of the United National Party member served as the General Secretary under Ranil Wickramasinghe until he resign from the post just months before the 2015 presidential election to support then president Rajapaksa. He alleged that in addition to the agreements reached with various political parties and organizations in public, Common Candidate Maithripala Sirisena has also signed different deals with those parties in private. UNP Leader Ranil Wickremesinghe also said that he wrote to the IGP requesting an inquiry into the concocted agreement and forgery as it carries similar signatures of the duo.

He was later arrested by the Criminal Investigation Department (CID).

He was released on bail, following the courts ruling that they did not have enough evidence to hold him in remand captivity.

References
 

1961 births
Living people
Sri Lankan Buddhists
Members of the 9th Parliament of Sri Lanka
Members of the 10th Parliament of Sri Lanka
Members of the 11th Parliament of Sri Lanka
Members of the 12th Parliament of Sri Lanka
Members of the 13th Parliament of Sri Lanka
Members of the 14th Parliament of Sri Lanka
Members of the 16th Parliament of Sri Lanka
Government ministers of Sri Lanka
Samagi Jana Balawegaya politicians
United National Party politicians